Aaptos robustus is a species of sea sponge belonging to the family Suberitidae. The species was described in 2008.

References

Aaptos
Animals described in 2008